Let There Be Love was an album of songs recorded by Joni James as airchecks, released by Jasmine Records on March 1, 1993. While many of the songs included on the album were hits for Joni James in the 1950s, these are different performances.

Track listing

References

Joni James albums
1993 compilation albums
Jasmine Records compilation albums